Paul J. Schissler (November 11, 1893 – April 16, 1968) was an American football, basketball, and baseball coach. He coached football at the high school, college, and professional levels, and is credited with starting the National Football League's annual Pro Bowl.

Coaching career
Schissler first coaching position was as the head football coach at Hastings High School in Hastings, Nebraska. He had been a stand-out athlete at HHS, graduating in 1911. He coached there for two seasons, from 1913 to 1914.

College
Schissler's first collegiate position was as the 16th head football coach at Doane College in Crete, Nebraska.  He only coached one season with Doane College during the 1915 season and had a record of 5–3. Schissler left Doane to become the head football coach at St. Viator College in Bourbonnais, Illinois where he coached again for only one season in 1916.

In 1919, Schissler went to the University of Nebraska.  There he was an assistant football coach, the head basketball coach, and the head baseball coach.  Schissler was the head coach of the basketball team for two seasons, posting a 37–5 overall record. As the head baseball coach at Nebraska, Schissler posted a three-year record of 20–14.

In 1921, Schissler was appointed as the athletic director at Lombard College in Galesburg, Illinois.

Schissler was the head football coach for Oregon State from 1924 to 1932. During his nine-year tenure, he compiled a 48–30–2 (.613) record. He led the Beavers to three seven-win seasons in 1925, 1926, and 1930. He was known for opening seasons strong, having had a 76–0 win against Willamette University, a 67–0 win against Multnomah Athletic Club, and a 51–0 win against Willamette.

NFL
Schissler first foray in to coaching in the NFL was with the Chicago Cardinals from 1933 to 1934.  In his time as the Cardinals head coach he posted a record of 6–15–1.

From 1935 to 1936, he was the head coach for the Brooklyn Dodgers NFL team in New York City, compiling a record of 8–14–2.

Later career
Schissler later owned and coached the Hollywood Bears football team of the Pacific Coast Pro Football League.<ref name=ross>Ross, Charles Kenyatta. 1999. Outside the lines African Americans and the integration of the National Football League. New York: New York University Press.</ref> There he coached and played with Kenny Washington before Washington was allowed to play in the NFL. Schissler sold Washington's contract to the Los Angeles Rams in 1946. Schissler also coached the NFL's Chicago Cardinals and the Hollywood Stars of the California Pro Football League, and during World War II served in the military where he also coached a football team. Later, Schissler helped start the Pro Bowl in 1951 while working for the Los Angeles Times.

Death
Schissler died in Hastings, Nebraska, on April 16, 1968, at the age of 74.

Head coaching record
College football

Notesi.'' ^  Nebraska basketball media guide has name spelled 'Schlisser', however other documents do show Schissler as a coach at Nebraska during that time frame, including the Nebraska baseball media guide.

References

External links
 

1968 deaths
1893 births
Brooklyn Dodgers (NFL) coaches
Chicago Cardinals coaches
Doane Tigers football coaches
Doane Tigers men's basketball coaches
High school football coaches in Nebraska
Lombard Olive athletic directors
Lombard Olive football coaches
March Field Flyers football coaches
Nebraska Cornhuskers baseball coaches
Nebraska Cornhuskers football coaches
Nebraska Cornhuskers men's basketball coaches
Nebraska Wesleyan Prairie Wolves men's basketball coaches
Oregon State Beavers football coaches
St. Viator Irish football coaches
Chicago Cardinals head coaches